Houvin-Houvigneul is a commune in the Pas-de-Calais department in the Hauts-de-France region of France.

Geography
The commune was created in 1856 by merging Houvin and Houvigneul.

Population

Places of interest
 The church of St.Killen, dating from the fifteenth century.
 A ruined 15th century tower.
 The chapel at Houvin, dating from the seventeenth century.
 A seventeenth century farmhouse

See also
Communes of the Pas-de-Calais department

References

Houvinhouvigneul